Szymon Walków and Tristan-Samuel Weissborn were the defending champions but chose not to defend their title.

Harri Heliövaara and Roman Jebavý won the title after defeating Nuno Borges and Francisco Cabral 6–4, 6–3 in the final.

Seeds

Draw

References

External links
 Main draw

Sánchez-Casal Cup - Doubles